Brighter Star English School is a secondary school situated at Damak, Morang, Nepal. It was established in 1993. It is one of the popular and competitive schools of Damak. This school is conducted by Sudhin Shikxaya Pratisthan and runs under PABSON.

Principal of this school is Mr. DN Mishra. Other teachers are Dhairyanath Nepal, Dinesh Shrestha, Kumar Gurung, Lumbakraj Adhikari, Prasub Prasai and so on. This school teaches up to Secondary Level i.e. grade ten. School is facilitated with Science Lab, Computer Lab, Projector class, Dance class and different others..

References

Educational institutions established in 1993
Secondary schools in Nepal
Buildings and structures in Jhapa District
1993 establishments in Nepal